Prayers & Observations (released 2006 by the label Jazzland 2006) is the second album by jazz composer and vocalist Torun Eriksen. In ten new songs written by Eriksen, she is once again joined by her loyal musicians. As her first release Glittercard (Jazzland 2003) was produced by Bugge Wesseltoft, he again applies his trademark production to this album.

Musicians
Kjetil Dalland (bass)
Torstein Lofthus (drums)
David Wallumrød (keyboards)
Frøydis Grorud (saxophone and flute)

Track listing
«Joy» (4:05)
«My Boys» (4:26)
«Way To Go» (4:33)
«Song Of Sadness» (3:49)
«Featuring Youth» (5:24)
«The Sky From Where I Live» (5:12)
«Stories» (4:39)
«This Is Real» (4:44)
«Tired» (4:46)
«Saviour» (3:27)

Credits 
Producer – Bugge Wesseltoft
Recorded By, Mixed By – Andy Mytteis, Bugge Wesseltoft

Notes 
Recorded at Bugges Room Spring & Fall 2005 
P 2005 Jazzland Recordings c 2005 Universal Music Norway 
Total playing time: 45:09

References

External links 
Listen to the album Prayers & Observations

2006 albums
Torun Eriksen albums
Jazzland Recordings albums